Madhusmita Somnath Behera (born 4 October 1990 at Cuttack, Orissa) is an Indian cricketer. She is a right-handed batsman and bowls right-arm off-break. She plays for Odisha and East Zone. She has played 8 First-class, 71 List A and 43 Women's Twenty20.

References 

1990 births
Living people
People from Cuttack
Cricketers from Odisha
Sportswomen from Odisha
Odisha women cricketers
East Zone women cricketers
Indian women cricketers